IGBC or Indice General de la Bolsa de Valores de Colombia was the main stock market index of Colombia Stock Exchange and consisted of the 30 most actively traded shares of the market. The companies listed on IGBC are reviewed each quarter and may vary or not the composition of the index, that depends on the performance of the company's stock on the stock exchange.

This Index has been replaced in November 2013 by the new index COLCAP.

Economy of Colombia
South American stock market indices